The 2019–20 NBL season was the 39th season for the Adelaide 36ers in the NBL.

Roster

Depth chart

Preseason 
The 36ers pre-season included 7 regular pre-season games, 2 NBL Blitz games and 1 NBLxNBA games. Their first two games were part of a tour of Philippines, before they had three games in Perth against the Perth Wildcats. As a club in the NBL they also took part in the NBL Blitz and played games against the Brisbane Bullets and the Cairns Taipans, which was followed by another 2 pre-season games in Adelaide against the New Zealand Breakers and Melbourne United. They finished their pre-season with a game against the Utah Jazz after the first regular season game of the 2019–20 NBL season.

Ladder

Game log 

|- style="background-color:#ffcccc;"
| 1
| 23 August
| @ Philippines
| L 92-83
| Ramone Moore (16)
| Harry Froling (7)
| Daniel Dillon (5)
| Meralco Gym
| 0-1
|- style="background-color:#ccffcc;"
| 2
| 25 August
| @ Philippines
|  W 75-85
|  Daniel Johnson (16)
|  Harry Froling (9)
|  Daniel Johnson (4)
| Meralco Gym
|  1-1

|- style="background-color:#ccffcc;"
| 3
| 4 September
| @ Perth Wildcats
| W 84-90
| Deshon Taylor (20)
| Harry Froling (5)
| Ramone Moore (6)
| Mandurah Aquatic & Recreation Centre
| 2-1
|- style="background-color:#ffcccc;"
| 4
| 6 September
| @ Perth Wildcats
| L 100-98
| Harry Froling (27)
| Harry Froling (10)
| Daniel Dillon (5)
| South West Sports Centre
| 2-2
|- style="background-color:#ccffcc;"
| 5
| 8 September
| @ Perth Wildcats
| W 77-83
| Jack McVeigh (18)
| Harry Froling (8)
| Harry Froling (6)
| HBF Arena
| 3-2

|- style="background-color:#ffcccc;"
| 1
| 19 September
| Cairns Taipans
| L 100-99
| Daniel Johnson (27)
| Harry Froling (7)
| Deshon Taylor (4)
| Ulverstone Sports & Leisure Centre
| 0-1
|- style="background-color:#ffcccc;"
| 2
| 21 September
| Brisbane Bullets
| L 85-92
| Deshon Taylor (23)
| Anthony Drmic (5)
| Ramone Moore (6)
| Silverdome
| 0-2

|- style="background-color:#ccffcc;"
| 6
| 24 September
| New Zealand Breakers
| W 93-67
| Eric Griffin (18)
| Harry Froling (10)
| Anthony Drmic (4)
| Titanium Security Arena
| 4-2
|- style="background-color:#ffcccc;"
| 7
| 27 September
| Melbourne United
| L 91-100
| Eric Griffin (16)
| Obi Kyei, Eric Griffin (6)
| Ramone Moore (9)
| Adelaide Entertainment Centre
| 4-3

|- style="background-color:#ffcccc;"
| 1
| 5 October
| @ Utah Jazz
| L 133-81
| Jerome Randle (18)
| Harry Froling (11)
| Daniel Dillon (4)
| Vivint Smart Home Arena 
| 4-4

Regular season
The regular season of the NBL consisted of 28 games, with the 36ers' 14 home games played at the Adelaide Entertainment Centre after leaving Titanium Security Arena during the off-season.

Ladder

Game log

|- style="background-color:#ffcccc;"
| 1
| 12 October
| @ Sydney Kings
| L 102-80
| Daniel Johnson (26)
| Harry Froling, Obi Kyei (7)
| Jerome Randle (5)
| Qudos Bank Arena 
| 0-1
|- style="background-color:#ccffcc;"
| 2
| 19 October
| Brisbane Bullets
| W 104-98
| Eric Griffin (22)
| Daniel Johnson (7)
| Jerome Randle (5)
| Adelaide Entertainment Centre
| 1-1
|- style="background-color:#ccffcc;"
| 3
| 21 October
| @ Illawarra Hawks
| W 92-98
| Daniel Johnson (21)
| Daniel Johnson (10)
| Anthony Drmic, Ramone Moore (4)
| WIN Entertainment Centre
| 2-1
|- style="background-color:#ccffcc;"
| 4
| 25 October
| Cairns Taipans
| W 101-97
| Jerome Randle (22)
| Obiri Kyei (9)
| Anthony Drmic (3)
| Adelaide Entertainment Centre
| 3-1
|- style="background-color:#ffcccc;"
| 5
| 27 October
| @ South East Melbourne Phoenix
| L 101-91
| Daniel Johnson (20)
| Daniel Johnson (13)
| Jerome Randle (4)
| Melbourne Arena 
| 3-2

|- style="background-color:#ffcccc;"
| 6
| 2 November
| Sydney Kings
| L 96-98
| Jerome Randle (23)
| Anthony Drmic (15)
| Jerome Randle (4)
| Adelaide Entertainment Centre 
| 3-3
|- style="background-color:#ffcccc;"
| 7
| 10 November
| @ Melbourne United
| L 109-90
| Jerome Randle (17)
| Daniel Johnson (4)
| Moore, Randle, White (3)
| Melbourne Arena 
| 3-4
|- style="background-color:#ffcccc;"
| 8
| 15 November
| Perth Wildcats
| L 95-99
| Daniel Johnson, Jerome Randle (23)
| Daniel Johnson (13)
| Jerome Randle (6)
| Adelaide Entertainment Centre
| 3-5
|- style="background-color:#ccffcc;"
| 9
| 18 November
| @ South East Melbourne Phoenix
| W 91-103
| Jerome Randle (27)
| Anthony Drmic (8)
| Eric Griffin (5)
| Melbourne Arena
| 4-5
|- style="background-color:#ffcccc;"
| 10
| 22 November
| @ Brisbane Bullets
| L 106-104
| Anthony Drmic, Jerome Randle (25)
| Eric Griffin (8)
| Anthony Drmic (6)
| Nissan Arena
| 4-6
|- style="background-color:#ccffcc;"
| 11
| 24 November
| New Zealand Breakers
| W 117-100
| Eric Griffin (24)
| Daniel Johnson (11)
| Ramone Moore (4)
| Adelaide Entertainment Centre 
| 5-6

|- style="background-color:#ccffcc;"
| 12
| 1 December
| @ Perth Wildcats
| W 88-99
| Daniel Johnson (29)
| Daniel Johnson (17)
| Jerome Randle (8)
| RAC Arena
| 6-6
|- style="background-color:#ffcccc;"
| 13
| 7 December
| @ Melbourne United
| L 112-90
| Eric Griffin (34)
| Eric Griffin (9)
| Froling, Griffin, Johnson, Randle (2)
| Melbourne Arena
| 6-7
|- style="background-color:#ccffcc;"
| 14
| 13 December
| South East Melbourne Phoenix
| W 113-111
| Jerome Randle (26)
| Eric Griffin (10)
| Jerome Randle (8)
| Adelaide Entertainment Centre
| 7-7
|- style="background-color:#ccffcc;"
| 15
| 15 December
| @ New Zealand Breakers
| W 96-99
| Jerome Randle (29)
| Eric Griffin (8)
| Jerome Randle (4)
| Spark Arena 
| 8-7
|- style="background-color:#ffcccc;"
| 16
| 20 December
| Illawarra Hawks
| L 84-93
| Jerome Randle (26)
| Eric Griffin (10)
| Jerome Randle (6)
| Adelaide Entertainment Centre
| 8-8
|- style="background-color:#ffcccc;"
| 17
| 22 December
| @ Cairns Taipans
| L 94-86
| Jerome Randle (19)
| Eric Griffin (11)
| Jerome Randle (7)
| Cairns Convention Centre
| 8-9
|- style="background-color:#ffcccc;"
| 18
| 29 December
| New Zealand Breakers
| L 87-96
| Jerome Randle (28)
| Daniel Johnson (10)
| Jerome Randle, Brendan Teys (4)
| Adelaide Entertainment Centre
| 8-10

|- style="background-color:#ccffcc;"
| 19
| 1 January
| Perth Wildcats
| W 100-97
| Eric Griffin (24)
| Daniel Johnson (7)
| Daniel Johnson (6)
| Adelaide Entertainment Centre 
| 9-10
|- style="background-color:#ffcccc;"
| 20
| 4 January
| @ Sydney Kings
| L 91-77
| Jerome Randle (24)
| Daniel Johnson (11)
| Jerome Randle (6)
| Qudos Bank Arena
| 9-11
|- style="background-color:#ccffcc;"
| 21
| 6 January
| Illawarra Hawks
| W 102-96
| Anthony Drmic (24)
| Eric Griffin (9)
| Brendan Teys (5)
| Adelaide Entertainment Centre
| 10-11
|- style="background-color:#ccffcc;"
| 22
| 11 January
| Melbourne United
| W 100-86
| Jerome Randle (23)
| Eric Griffin (11)
| Anthony Drmic, Brendan Teys (4)
| Adelaide Entertainment Centre
| 11-11
|- style="background-color:#ffcccc;"
| 23
| 18 January
| @ Cairns Taipans
| L 108-91
| Daniel Johnson (38)
| Jerome Randle (9)
| Jerome Randle (10)
| Cairns Convention Centre
| 11-12
|- style="background-color:#ffcccc;"
| 24
| 25 January
| Brisbane Bullets
| L 99-108
| Eric Griffin, Jerome Randle (21)
| Daniel Johnson (10)
| Daniel Dillon, Jerome Randle (5)
| Adelaide Entertainment Centre
| 11-13
|- style="background-color:#ffcccc;"
| 25
| 31 January
| @ New Zealand Breakers
| L 113-89
| Daniel Johnson (24)
| Daniel Johnson (9)
| Jerome Randle (6)
| Spark Arena
| 11-14

|- style="background-color:#ccffcc;"
| 26
| 2 February
| South East Melbourne Phoenix
| W 100-93
| Jerome Randle (35)
| Anthony Drmic (10)
| Brendan Teys (6)
| Adelaide Entertainment Centre
| 12-14
|- style="background-color:#ffcccc;"
| 27
| 8 February
| Cairns Taipans
| L 80-99
| Daniel Johnson (14)
| Eric Griffin (9)
| Daniel Johnson, Jerome Randle (5)
| Adelaide Entertainment Centre 
| 12-15
|- style="background-color:#ffcccc;"
| 28
| 15 February
| @ Perth Wildcats
| L 94-79
| Daniel Johnson (18)
| Daniel Johnson (11)
| Harry Froling (5)
| RAC Arena
| 12-16

Awards

Player of the Week
Round 7, Jerome Randle

Round 11, Jerome Randle

See also
2019–20 NBL season
Adelaide 36ers

References

External links
 Official Website

Adelaide 36ers Season
Adelaide 36ers Season
Adelaide 36ers
Adelaide 36ers seasons